WABCO was a U.S.-based provider of electronic braking, stability, suspension, and transmission automation systems for heavy-duty commercial vehicles.

History
The Westinghouse Air Brake Company, founded in the U.S. in 1869, was acquired by American Standard in 1968. The earthmoving and mining product range was sold to Dresser Industries in 1984, before the remainder was spun off in 2007 as WABCO Holdings, Inc.

Previously headquartered in Bern, Switzerland (having moved from Brussels, Belgium in February 2019), WABCO employed more than 11000 people in 34 countries worldwide. In 2013, WABCO's total sales were $2,720.5 million, a rise of 10% over the previous year. WABCO was a publicly traded company listed on the New York Stock Exchange as WABCO Holdings, Inc., with the stock symbol WBC.

On 28 March 2019, German auto parts maker ZF Friedrichshafen announced an agreement to acquire WABCO for over $7 billion based on customary regulatory and shareholder approvals. On 29 May 2020, WABCO was acquired by ZF Friedrichshafen through a merger agreement and thereafter became the Commercial Vehicle Control Systems division of ZF.

References

Commercial vehicles
Vehicle safety technologies
Vehicle braking technologies